Accommodation is the process by which the vertebrate eye changes optical power to maintain a clear image or focus on an object as its distance varies.  In this, distances vary for individuals from the far point—the maximum distance from the eye for which a clear image of an object can be seen, to the near point—the minimum distance for a clear image.
Accommodation usually acts like a reflex, including part of the accommodation-vergence reflex, but it can also be consciously controlled. Mammals, birds and reptiles vary their eyes' optical power by changing the form of the elastic lens using the ciliary body (in humans up to 15 dioptres in the mean). Fish and amphibians vary the power by changing the distance between a rigid lens and the retina with muscles.

 The young human eye can change focus from distance (infinity) to as near as 6.5 cm from the eye. This dramatic change in focal power of the eye of approximately 15 dioptres (the reciprocal of focal length in metres) occurs as a consequence of a reduction in zonular tension induced by ciliary muscle contraction. This process can occur in as little as 224 ± 30 milliseconds in bright light. The amplitude of accommodation declines with age. By the fifth decade of life the accommodative amplitude can decline so that the near point of the eye is more remote than the reading distance. When this occurs the patient is presbyopic. Once presbyopia occurs, those who are emmetropic (i.e., do not require optical correction for distance vision) will need an optical aid for near vision; those who are myopic (nearsighted and require an optical correction for distance or far vision), will find that they see better at near without their distance correction; and those who are hyperopic (farsighted) will find that they may need a correction for both distance and near vision. Note that these effects are most noticeable when the pupil is large; i.e. in dim light. The age-related decline in accommodation occurs almost universally to less than 2 dioptres by the time a person reaches 45 to 50 years, by which time most of the population will have noticed a decrease in their ability to focus on close objects and hence require glasses for reading or bifocal lenses. Accommodation decreases to about 1 dioptre at the age of 70 years. The dependency of accommodation amplitude on age is graphically summarized by Duane's classical curves.

Theories of mechanism of the eye
 Helmholtz—The most widely held theory of accommodation is that proposed by Hermann von Helmholtz in 1855. When viewing a far object, the circularly arranged ciliary muscle relaxes allowing the lens zonules and suspensory ligaments to pull on the lens, flattening it. The source of the tension is the pressure that the vitreous and aqueous humours exert outwards onto the sclera. When viewing a near object, the ciliary muscles contract (resisting the outward pressure on the sclera) causing the lens zonules to slacken which allows the lens to spring back into a thicker, more convex, form.
 Schachar—Ronald A. Schachar has proposed in 1992 what has been called a "rather bizarre geometric theory" which claims that focus by the human lens is associated with increased tension on the lens via the equatorial zonules; that when the ciliary muscle contracts, equatorial zonular tension is increased, causing the central surfaces of the crystalline lens to steepen, the central thickness of the lens to increase (anterior-posterior diameter), and the peripheral surfaces of the lens to flatten. While the tension on equatorial zonules is increased during accommodation, the anterior and posterior zonules are simultaneously relaxing. The increased equatorial zonular tension keeps the lens stable and flattens the peripheral lens surface during accommodation. As a consequence, gravity does not affect the amplitude of accommodation and primary spherical aberration shifts in the negative direction during accommodation. The theory has not found much independent support.
 Catenary—D. Jackson Coleman proposes that the lens, zonule and anterior vitreous comprise a diaphragm between the anterior and vitreous chambers of the eye. Ciliary muscle contraction initiates a pressure gradient between the vitreous and aqueous compartments that support the anterior lens shape. It is in this lens shape that the mechanically reproducible state of a steep radius of curvature in the center of the lens with slight flattening of the peripheral anterior lens, i.e. the shape, in cross section, of a catenary occurs. The anterior capsule and the zonule form a trampoline shape or hammock shaped surface that is totally reproducible depending on the circular dimensions, i.e. the diameter of the ciliary body (Müeller's muscle). The ciliary body thus directs the shape like the pylons of a suspension bridge, but does not need to support an equatorial traction force to flatten the lens.

Induced effects of accommodation
When humans accommodate to a near object, they also converge their eyes and, as a result, constrict their pupils. However, the constriction of the pupils is not part of the process called lens accommodation. The combination of these three movements (accommodation, convergence and miosis) is under the control of the Edinger-Westphal nucleus and is referred to as the near triad, or accommodation reflex. While it is well understood that proper convergence is necessary to prevent diplopia, the functional role of the pupillary constriction remains less clear. Arguably, it may increase the depth of field by reducing the aperture of the eye, and thus reduce the amount of accommodation needed to bring the image in focus on the retina.

There is a measurable ratio (Matthiessen's ratio) between how much convergence takes place because of accommodation (AC/A ratio, CA/C ratio). Abnormalities with this can lead to binocular vision problems.

Anomalies of accommodation
There are many types of accommodation anomalies. It can be broadly classified into two, decreased accommodation and increased accommodation. Decreased accommodation may occur due to physiological (presbyopia), pharmacological (cycloplegia) or pathological. Excessive accommodation and spasm of accommodation are types of increased accommodation.

Presbyopia
Presbyopia, physiological insufficiency of accommodation due to age related changes in lens (decreased elasticity and increased hardness) and ciliary muscle power is the commonest form of accommodative dysfunction. It will cause gradual decrease in near vision.

Accommodative insufficiency
Accommodative insufficiency is the condition where amplitude of accommodation of a person is lesser compared to physiological limits for their age. Premature sclerosis of lens or ciliary muscle weaknesses due to systemic or local cases may cause accommodative insufficiency.
Accommodative insufficiency is further categorised into different categories.

Ill-sustained accommodation
Ill-sustained accommodation is a condition similar to accommodative insufficiency. In this, range of accommodation will be normal, but after excessive near work accommodative power will decrease.

Paralysis of accommodation
In paralysis of accommodation, amplitude of accommodation is either markedly reduced or completely absent (cycloplegia). It may occur due to ciliary muscle paralysis or occulomotor nerve paralysis. Parasympatholytic drugs like atropine will also cause paralysis of accommodation.

Unequal accommodation
If there is amplitude of accommodation between the eyes differ 0.5 dioptre or more, it is considered as unequal. Organic diseases, head trauma or functional amblyopia may be responsible for unequal accommodation.

Accommodative infacility
Accommodative infacility is also known as accommodative inertia. In this condition there will be difficulty in changing accommodation from one point to other. There may be difficulty in adjusting focus from distance from near. It is a comparatively rare condition.

Spasm of accommodation
Spasm of accommodation also known as ciliary spasm is a condition of abnormally excessive accommodation which is out of voluntary control of the person. Vision may be blurred due to induced pseudomyopia.

Accommodative excess
Accommodative excess occurs when an individual uses more than normal accommodation for performing certain near work. Modern definitions simply regard it as an inability to relax accommodation readily.

See also

Disorders of and relating to accommodation
 Accommodative esotropia
 Latent hyperopia
 Myopia
 Pseudomyopia

Other
 Accommodation in fish
 Adaptation (eye)
 Amplitude of accommodation
 Cycloplegia
 Cyclospasm
 Edinger-Westphal nucleus
 Mandelbaum Effect
 Negative relative accommodation
 Positive relative accommodation

References

External links
 —"Presbyopia: Cause and Treatment"
 

Eye
Optometry
Ophthalmology
Vision